...From the Pagan Vastlands is the fourth demo by Polish extreme metal band Behemoth. It was recorded at the Warrior Studio in December 1993 and released in February 1994 by Pagan Records.

The title track appeared on their debut album, Sventevith (Storming Near the Baltic). Frontman, Darski was 17 at the time of its recording and release.

Track listing 
All music by Nergal except "Deathcrush"; lyrics of tracks 1, 4 and 5 by Nergal; lyrics of tracks 2, 3 and 6 by Baal.

Personnel

Release history

References 

1993 albums
Behemoth (band) albums
Demo albums
Pagan Records albums
Wild Rags albums